Mark Andrew Foster (born 12 May 1970) is an English former competitive swimmer who represented Great Britain in the Olympics and world championships, and swam for England in the Commonwealth Games.  Foster is a former world champion and won multiple medals in international competition during his long career.  He competed primarily in butterfly and freestyle at 50 metres.

Foster is a specialist short-course (25 metre pool) swimmer. In terms of medals and longevity (1986–2008), he is amongst the most successful British swimmers of all time. He was the fastest swimmer in the country by age 15. He made a comeback at the national championships in July 2007 winning both events he competed in after barely training. He achieved the fifth best time in 2007 in the world at 50 metres freestyle and retired for the second time after the 2008 Olympics. He has six World Championship titles, two Commonwealth titles and eleven European titles to his name.

Early career 

Foster was born in Billericay, Essex, and was first taught by Ann Hardcastle, the mother of Sarah Hardcastle, at a pool in Southend-on-Sea. He was the fastest swimmer in the country by age 15.

Foster was educated at Alleyn Court Preparatory School in Westcliff on Sea, Millfield School, Kelly College and Southend High School for Boys where he excelled in athletics, football and tennis..

National Championships 
Foster dominated the short distances in the National Championships winning the 50 metres freestyle title 14 times from 1986 until 2004  and the 50 metres butterfly title ten times from 1992 until 2002.

International career 

First selected for the British team in 1985, Foster's breakthrough came in 1990 when he won his first individual international medal - bronze - in the Commonwealth Games in Auckland. He finished the 50 metres freestyle with a time of 23.16 seconds. He had previously won bronze as part of the 100 metre freestyle relay in the Edinburgh games four years previous, but cites the 1990 medal as his first great sporting moment.

Success followed rapidly and in the next few years, Foster broke the World Short Course freestyle record four times, the World Short Course butterfly record twice, and set the World Long Course butterfly record (in 1996) with a time of 24.07 seconds.

Foster trained at The Race Club, a Florida swim camp founded by Olympic Swimmers Gary Hall, Jr. and his father, Gary Hall, Sr. The Race Club, originally known as "The World Team," was designed to serve as a training group for elite swimmers across the world in preparation for the 2000 Sydney Olympic Games. To be able to train with the Race Club, one must either have been ranked in the top 20 in the world the past 3 calendar years or top 3 in their nation in the past year. The Race Club included such well known swimmers as Foster, Roland Mark Schoeman, Ryk Neethling, and Therese Alshammar.

Despite success at Commonwealth, European and World championship level mostly at short courses, Olympic titles eluded him and he has never won a medal.

In 2004, Foster faced the disappointment of not being selected for the Olympic Games. At the British Olympic Trials, he won the 50 free in 22.49 seconds, well under the Olympic qualifying standard but seven hundredths of a second below the standard National Team Director Bill Sweetenham had set for inclusion in the British Olympic Team. Foster has openly criticised Sweetenham's management style and Sweetenham ensured that he was not selected.

Nonetheless, Foster responded to his omission from the Olympic squad with a gold medal in the World Short Course Championships in Indianapolis later that year. In the 50 metre freestyle, he achieved 21.58 seconds, ahead of Stefan Nystrand of Sweden. Although Foster announced his retirement from swimming after the European short course championships in April 2006 at the age of 35, he still occasionally competed that year at invitational meets.

Foster returned from "retirement" in 2007 with an aim to win an Olympic medal at the 2008 Olympic Games. Returning to the British squad he won a silver medal in the 50 m freestyle at the 2008 FINA Short Course World Championships, and qualified to represent Great Britain at the same distance in the Olympics.  At the opening ceremony on 8 August, he carried the flag for Great Britain during the Parade of Nations.  He failed to qualify for the men's 50 m freestyle semi-finals, finishing almost two-tenths of a second outside the top 16.

Charity work 

In May 2009, Foster became patron of The Anaphylaxis Campaign, the UK charity for people with severe allergies. He won £10,000 for the campaign by participating in Who Wants to be a Millionaire?, broadcast on ITV on 8 September 2009.  In 1999, Foster's friend, Scottish athlete Ross Baillie died from anaphylaxis shortly after the pair had  gone out for lunch.

In October 2008, Foster was a celebrity judge for the Miele Fashion Prize, in aid of children's medical charity, Sparks.

In June 2009, Foster supported ActionAid's PoverTee Day by having a T-shirt painted on his torso.

Foster is also an ambassador for the UK charity SportsAid, which supported him in the early days of his career, helping talented young sports people to achieve their ambitions.

Awards 
In 2016, Foster became an Honorary Doctor of Health Sciences at Anglia Ruskin University.

Media appearances 
In 2000 he made a guest appearance on the first series of Techno Games.

On 4 April 2008, Foster appeared on the ITV show Beat the Star in which he won 18-3, appearing as the 'star'. On 20 May 2008, he appeared as a guest home owner on the BBC Two show Through the Keyhole.

In the Summer of 2008, he appeared on the new series of Superstars  on Channel 5.

In December 2008, Foster appeared on a Strictly Come Dancing special of The Weakest Link in December 2008,  beating Anton du Beke in the final round. He had previously appeared on an Olympic special, but did not win.

On 12 February 2009, Foster co-presented BBC Look East'''s 6.30 pm bulletin, with Susie Fowler-Watt.

Foster was a contestant on the BBC One programme Let's Dance for Sport Relief as a member of the dance group 'The Olympians'.

Foster regularly appears on BBC TV regional news and local radio in his role of Ambassador of Pools 4 Schools, a programme run by Total Swimming with the Amateur Swimming Association to increase participation in swimming amongst primary school children.

Foster appears in advertisements for Wellman nutritional products.

On 23 March 2012, Foster made a guest appearance on ITV2's  Celebrity Juice.

On 27 July 2012, Foster appeared on a Paralympic special of the Channel 4 game show The Million Pound Drop with Countdown presenter Rachel Riley.

Foster often appears as an analyst for BBC Sport's coverage of Swim meets.

Strictly Come Dancing

Foster competed in the sixth series of Strictly Come Dancing with professional dancer Hayley Holt. He was voted off by the judges in the dance-off on week 6. He participated in the Strictly Come Dancing'' arena tour in 2012, dancing with Natalie Lowe.

Personal bests and records held 

 Long course (50 m)

 Short course (25 m)

Personal life 
In 2002 Foster lived in Bath, UK, sharing a flat with former 110m hurdles Olympic silver medallist and World champion athlete Colin Jackson.

In November 2017, Foster came out as gay.

See also 

 2008 Summer Olympics national flag bearers
 List of Commonwealth Games medallists in swimming (men)
 List of LGBT Olympians
 World record progression 50 metres butterfly
 World record progression 50 metres freestyle

References

External links 
 
 
 British Swimming athlete profile
 British Olympic Association athlete profile
 Mark Foster's swimming masterclass (BBC)
 British Swimming results and rankings database entry
 The Anaphylaxis Campaign
 The Race Club
 Interview with Mark Foster

1970 births
Living people
Commonwealth Games gold medallists for England
Commonwealth Games silver medallists for England
Commonwealth Games bronze medallists for England
British male swimmers
English male swimmers
British male freestyle swimmers
Male butterfly swimmers
World record setters in swimming
People educated at Millfield
Olympic swimmers of Great Britain
People from Billericay
Sportspeople from Southend-on-Sea
Gay sportsmen
English LGBT sportspeople
Swimmers at the 1988 Summer Olympics
Swimmers at the 1992 Summer Olympics
Swimmers at the 1996 Summer Olympics
Swimmers at the 2000 Summer Olympics
Swimmers at the 2008 Summer Olympics
Swimmers at the 1986 Commonwealth Games
Swimmers at the 1990 Commonwealth Games
Swimmers at the 1994 Commonwealth Games
Swimmers at the 1998 Commonwealth Games
Swimmers at the 2002 Commonwealth Games
People educated at Alleyn Court School
People educated at Southend High School for Boys
World Aquatics Championships medalists in swimming
Medalists at the FINA World Swimming Championships (25 m)
European Aquatics Championships medalists in swimming
Commonwealth Games medallists in swimming
Team Bath swimmers
LGBT swimmers
British LGBT sportspeople
Medallists at the 1986 Commonwealth Games
Medallists at the 1990 Commonwealth Games
Medallists at the 1994 Commonwealth Games
Medallists at the 1998 Commonwealth Games
Medallists at the 2002 Commonwealth Games